Göztepe was founded in 1925 as a breakaway club from Altay. Their colours are red and yellow. They merged with İzmirspor and were renamed as Doğanspor in 1937. Some supporters of İzmirspor opposed the merger and founded Ateşspor in 1938. Doğanspor was renamed again as Göztepe in 1939. Ateşspor was also renamed as İzmirspor the same year. The club enjoyed their best success between the years 1963 and 1971 under the supervision of the coach Adnan Süvari. Their 11 during that period of success is still remembered today: Ali Artuner, Mehmet "Junior" Işıkal, Çağlayan Derebaşı, Hüseyin Yazıcı, Mehmet "Senior" Aydın, Nevzat "English" Guzelırmak, Nihat Yayöz, Ertan Öznur, Fevzi Zemzem, Gürsel Aksel, Halil Kiraz.

Past seasons

Domestic results

League affiliation
 Süper Lig: 1959–77, 1978–80, 1981–82, 1999–2000, 2001–03
 TFF First League: 1977–78, 1980–81, 1982–99, 2000–01, 2003–04, 2011–13, 2015–
 TFF Second League: 2004–05, 2009–11, 2013–15
 TFF Third League: 2005–07, 2008–09
 Amateur Level: 2007–08

References

Notes

seasons
Göztepe